Ramdas Rupla Gavit was a member of the 13th Lok Sabha of India. He represented the Dhule constituency of Maharashtra and is a member of the Bharatiya Janata Party political party.

References

People from Maharashtra
India MPs 1999–2004
Living people
Marathi politicians
Bharatiya Janata Party politicians from Maharashtra
Lok Sabha members from Maharashtra
People from Dhule district
1940 births